S52 may refer to:
 S52 (New York City bus), serving Staten Island
 BMW S52, an automobile engine
 Expressway S52 (Poland)
 S52: Not recommended for interior use on large surface areas, a safety phrase
 SIAI S.52, an Italian prototype fighter aircraft
 Sikorsky S-52, an American helicopter
 Shorland S52, a British armoured car